Barzul (also Romanized as Barzūl) is a city and capital of Zarrin Dasht District, in Nahavand County, Hamadan Province, Iran. At the 2006 census, its population was 2,729, in 728 families.

References

Populated places in Nahavand County

Cities in Hamadan Province